Urbanc is a surname. Notable people with the surname include:

Dejan Urbanč (born 1984), Slovenian footballer
Rok Urbanc (born 1985), Slovenian ski jumper